Calpack is an unincorporated community in Merced County, California. The community was named for the California Packing Corporation. It has a population of 50.

References

Unincorporated communities in California
Unincorporated communities in Merced County, California